Shougrakpam Hemanta (born 1969) is an Indian comedian, actor, writer and director, who has worked in various Shumang Kumhei plays and Manipuri films. He is well known for his role of Oja Tolhan in Eegi Mahao and his portrayal of the titular role in the movie Mantri Dolansana. In 2017, he was conferred with the prestigious Sangeet Natak Akademi Award in recognition of his contribution in the traditional Meitei theatre of the Shumang Kumhei. With this, he became the first person to receive the award for this art form.

Shougrakpam Hemanta is also the lifetime secretary of Manipur State Shumang Leela Council.

Career
Hemanta joined Shumang Kumhei on 20 December 1982. In the beginning of his career in the field of performing arts, he did not receive patronage from his parents. With his strong courage and determination, he continued to learn the basics of the traditional theatre form. He had received guidance from renowned theatre personalities like L. Ibotombi Sharma, N. Angouton Meetei and T. Nabakumar Singh. He received the first Best Comedian award for his role in the Shumang Leela Sharat Ritugi Purnima. He has acted in more than 70 plays. Some of his well known plays include Lidicegee Gulap, Memsahebki Saree, Kanchi Ashram and Ningol Chakkouba. He has also directed more than 20 Shumang Leelas and wrote around eight plays. He bagged the Best Director Award and won Best Comedian Award 25 times.

His is popularly known as Oja Tolhan for his comic role of a teacher in the movie Eegi Mahao. His titular role in the comedy-genre film Mantri Dolansana is also vividly remembered until today by the cinema lovers of Manipur. He has directed a movie named Shakhangdaba.

Selected Shumang Kumhei plays

 Sharat Ritugi Purnima
 Kanchi Ashram
 Lidicegee Gulap
 Devadas
 Memsahebki Saree
 Ningol Chakkouba
 Ugandagee Maraibak
 Nangna Luhongdringei
 Ingagee Purnima
 Urirei Madhabee
 Samballeina Kundo
 Mangluraba Lann
 Sanagee Ching
 Sagol Kangjei
 Mera Thaomei
 Khoi Mahum
 Ee Maree
 Luchingba
 Mellei Laishna
 Ahinggi Likla
 Kolom Semkhraba Leihao
 Pameldugee Ukhada
 Leikanglada Thambal
 Leikrakta Lou Uba (2020)
 Keidoubagi Kidoino (2021)
 Wakhal Eronba (2022)
 Ireibakkidamak (2022)

Selected filmography

External links

References

Indian male film actors
Living people
People from Imphal
20th-century Indian male actors
Meitei people
1969 births
Male actors from Manipur
Shumang Kumhei artists